Agromyza nigripes is a species of fly in the family Agromyzidae. It is found in the Palearctic.  The body is black. The  thorax and abdomen are shiny. There are 1 + 4 dorsocentral bristles and 7 rows of acrostical bristles. The wing veins are brown, yellow at the base. Long. : 2–3,5 mm. The larva makes serpentine mines in Medicago sativa leaves.

References

External links
Images representing  Agromyza nigripes at BOLD

Agromyzidae
Insects described in 1830
Muscomorph flies of Europe